Lewisham Borough (Community) Football Club is a football club based in Catford, in the London Borough of Lewisham.

History
The club was established in 2003 as a merger of Elms, Moonshot and Ten Em Bee. They were admitted to Division One West of the Kent County League and went to win the division at the first attempt. The club were promoted to the Premier Division, which they won in 2005–06. In 2011 they were founder members of the Kent Invicta League. The club subsequently finished bottom of the league in 2012–13, 2014–15 and 2015–16. In 2016 the Kent Invicta league merged into the Southern Counties East League, becoming its Division One. Lewisham finished bottom of the division again in its inaugural season.

Shortly before the start of the 2018–19 season, Lewisham resigned from the Southern Counties East League. However, they were reinstated to the league a day later.

Honours
Kent County League
Premier Division champions 2005–06
Division One West champions 2003–04

Records
Best FA Vase performance: First qualifying round, 2017–18, 2018–19

References

External links

 
Football clubs in England
Football clubs in London
Association football clubs established in 2003
2003 establishments in England
Kent County League
Kent Invicta Football League
Southern Counties East Football League
Catford